{{safesubst:#invoke:RfD|||month = March
|day = 13
|year = 2023
|time = 19:27
|timestamp = 20230313192718

|content=
REDIRECT List of Graeco-Roman geographers

}}